Magnanimity (from Latin magnanimitās, from magna "big" + animus "soul, spirit") is the virtue of being great of mind and heart.  It encompasses, usually, a refusal to be petty, a willingness to face danger, and actions for noble purposes. Its antithesis is pusillanimity (Latin: pusillanimitās). Although the word magnanimity has a traditional connection to Aristotelian philosophy, it also has its own tradition in English which now causes some confusion.

Aristotle
The Latin word magnanimitās is a calque of the Greek word μεγαλοψυχία (megalopsychia), which means "greatness of soul". In the context of Nicomachean Ethics IV.3, Aristotle associates megalopsychia more with a sense of pride and self-worth rather than the modern sense of magnanimity. Aristotle writes (1123b1-2), "Now a person is thought to be great-souled if he claims much and deserves much" (δοκεῖ δὴ μεγαλόψυχος εἶναι ὁ μεγάλων αὑτὸν ἀξιῶν ἄξιος ὤν). Aristotle continues (in H. Rackham's translation for Loeb Classical Library):

W.D. Ross translates Aristotle's statement ἔοικε μὲν οὖν ἡ μεγαλοψυχία οἷον κόσμος τις εἶναι τῶν ἀρετῶν· μείζους γὰρ αὐτὰς ποιεῖ, καὶ οὐ γίνεται ἄνευ ἐκείνων (1124a1-2) as the following: "Pride [megalopsychia], then, seems to be a sort of crown of the virtues; for it makes them greater, and it is not found without them." Reoccurring Greek Nimochean virtue is the act of forgiveness and reserving forgiveness for antagonism (personal rivalry or private enemy), careless words, severity and bad pride, secondly it is about clarifying the wrongful acts, the consequences of wrongful acts and continuing the good and bad consequences of wrongful acts by arrogance or meanness, that which strongly implies an overvaluation of worth compared to the societal valuation of its worth or compared to the common grounds for their status, and when commented on the discourse is described as a condescension and snobbish aloofness to detract from arrogant behavior and to place arrogance on one side.

Other uses
Noah Webster of the American Language defines Magnanimity as such:

MAGNANIMITY, n. [L. magnanimitas; magnus, great, and animus, mind.] Greatness of mind; that elevation or dignity of soul, which encounters danger and trouble with tranquility and firmness, which raises the possessor above revenge, and makes him delight in acts of benevolence, which makes him disdain injustice and meanness, and prompts him to sacrifice personal ease, interest and safety for the accomplishment of useful and noble objects.Thomas Aquinas adopted Aristotle's concept while adding the Christian virtues of humility and charity.

Edmund Spenser, in The Faerie Queene, had each knight allegorically represent a virtue; Prince Arthur represented "magnificence", which is generally taken to mean Aristotelian magnificence.  The uncompleted work does not include Prince Arthur's book, and the significance is not clear.

Democritus states that "magnanimity consists in enduring tactlessness with mildness".

Thomas Hobbes defines magnanimity as "contempt of little helps and hindrances" to one's ends. To Hobbes, contempt stands for an immobility of the heart, which is moved by other things and desires instead.

As an adjective, the concept is expressed as "magnanimous", e.g. "He is a magnanimous man."  An example of referring to one as magnanimous can be seen in Hrólfs saga kraka where King Hrólfr Kraki changes the name of a court servant from Hott to Hjalti for his new-found strength and courage, after which Hjalti refuses to taunt or kill those who previously mocked him.  Because of his noble actions, the king then bestows the title Magnanimous upon Hjalti.

One form of magnanimity is the generosity of the victor to the defeated. For example, magnanimity has been codified between societies by the Geneva Conventions.

Magnanimous relief efforts can serve to offset the collateral damage of war.

C. S. Lewis, in his book The Abolition of Man, refers to the chest of man as the seat of magnanimity, or sentiment, with this magnanimity working as the liaison between visceral and cerebral man. Lewis asserts that, in his time, the denial of the emotions that are found in the eternal and sublime—that which is humbling as an objective reality—had led to "men without chests".

References

External links

Philosophy of Aristotle
Rhetoric
Virtue